is a train station in Niimi, Okayama Prefecture, Japan.

Lines
West Japan Railway Company
Hakubi Line

Layout

Kan'i itaku station

Adjacent stations

References

Hakubi Line
Railway stations in Okayama Prefecture
Railway stations in Japan opened in 1928